Oleg Aleksandrov (Russian name: Олег Александров; 13 July 1937 – 1997) was a Soviet rower. He competed at the 1960 Summer Olympics in Rome with the men's coxed four where they came fourth. At the 1961 European Rowing Championships in Prague, the coxed four won a silver medal.

References

1937 births
1997 deaths
Soviet male rowers
Olympic rowers of the Soviet Union
Rowers at the 1960 Summer Olympics
Sportspeople from Yaroslavl
European Rowing Championships medalists
People from Yaroslavl